Kapstad is a surname. Notable people with the surname include:

Egil Kapstad (1940–2017), Norwegian jazz pianist, composer, and arranger
Kenneth Kapstad (born 1979), Norwegian drummer
Kevin Kapstad (born 1986), American ice hockey player

Norwegian-language surnames